Richard Charles Colpaert (January 3, 1943 – April 6, 2021) was an American professional baseball player.

Colpaert signed originally with the Baltimore Orioles and was drafted by Pittsburgh after his first pro season, in 1962. He was 26 years old and in the midst of his ninth pro season, almost exclusively spent as a reliever, when the Pirates recalled him from the Triple-A Columbus Jets. In his first two MLB appearances, Colpaert retired all nine batters he faced. In his second game, he received credit for a 6–5 victory over the Atlanta Braves on July 23, 1970, when he pitched a perfect eighth inning, retiring future Hall of Famers Henry Aaron and Orlando Cepeda in the process. He was largely effective as a reliever for the Pirates, with an earned run average of 2.89 heading into what would be his final MLB game on August 10. But on that day the New York Mets reached him for four earned runs on two hits and three bases on balls in only  innings, ballooning his career ERA by more than three full points.

All told, Colpaert worked  innings in the Majors, allowing nine hits, seven earned runs and eight bases on balls (two intentional), with six strikeouts. His minor league career continued into 1974.

References

External links

1944 births
2021 deaths
Asheville Tourists players
Baseball players from Michigan
Charleston Charlies players
Columbus Jets players
Hawaii Islanders players
Fox Cities Foxes players
Kinston Eagles players
Macon Peaches players
Major League Baseball pitchers
Oklahoma City 89ers players
Pawtucket Red Sox players
People from Fraser, Michigan
Pittsburgh Pirates players
Sportspeople from Metro Detroit
York Pirates players